The 1998 Vanderbilt Commodores football team represented Vanderbilt University in the 1998 NCAA Division I-A football season. The team played their home games at Vanderbilt Stadium in Nashville, Tennessee and finished the season with a record of two wins and nine losses (2–9, 1–7 in the SEC).

Schedule

References

Vanderbilt
Vanderbilt Commodores football seasons
Vanderbilt Commodores football